The Ducati 899 Panigale is a  sport bike from Ducati, released in 2013 to replace the 848. The motorcycle is named after the small manufacturing town of Borgo Panigale. It has a  version of the engine in the previously released 1199 Panigale. The 899 has a conventional two-sided swingarm, unlike the 1199 which has a single-sided swingarm. The unconventional decision to use a two-sided swingarm on a superbike from Ducati was made because of the substantial upgrades added to the bike including electronically adjustable anti-lock brakes, traction control, electronic braking control, and a quickshifter. This is the first medium-sized Ducati that uses the Superquadro engine.

The 899 surprised observers by topping sales charts for all motorcycles in the UK for December 2013, at a price five times higher than the number two seller, the Honda CBF125 — a situation compared by The Telegraph to the Ferrari California outselling the Ford Focus.

References

899
Motorcycles introduced in 2013